Pejorative terms for people